Pennsauken Township, New Jersey or "Pennsauken" for short, is a community in Camden County, New Jersey.

Pennsauken may also refer to the following places in New Jersey:

Schools
 Pennsauken High School
 Pennsauken Public Schools
 Pennsauken Technical High School

Streams
 Pennsauken Creek, a tributary of the Delaware River

Train stations
 Pennsauken Transit Center
 Pennsauken-Route 73 (River Line station)
 36th Street (River Line station)